Sukhendra Singh is an Indian politician and a member of the Indian National Congress party.

Political career
In 1995, he started his political journey by becoming Vice-President of District IYC and then became the President in 2010.

Since 2008 he is the president of District Co-op Bank, Rewa.
He became an MLA for the first time in 2013.

Legal affairs
He was booked for beating up CCF IFS P. K. Singh in 2017 along with his supporters.

See also
Madhya Pradesh Legislative Assembly
2013 Madhya Pradesh Legislative Assembly election

References

External links

Indian National Congress politicians from Madhya Pradesh
Living people
Year of birth missing (living people)